Becker Professional Education is a company that offers educational resources for professionals in the areas of accounting, finance, and project management.

Becker is best known as the largest provider of training for candidates who are preparing to sit for the United States (US) CPA Exam in order to become Certified Public Accountants.  Becker offers its CPA Exam Review in the form of live classes (which take place in locations throughout the US and around the world), as well as online courses. Becker no longer offers their course on disc, and instead allows students to download their course for offline use.

As a measure of its influence on the accounting industry, the AICPA's Journal of Accountancy estimated that as many as half of the CPAs in the United States have passed the CPA Exam with the help of Becker's course. Becker is rated by Investopedia as the Best Overall CPA Review course.

Originally developed in 1957 by accountant and entrepreneur Newton Becker as a training course for fellow employees of Price Waterhouse, Becker CPA Review was launched as an independent company in Cleveland in 1960. The company grew rapidly, and by the 1980s it had classroom locations in more than 90 cities. Becker eventually sold the company to DeVry in 1996, partly due to changes in the industry. 

In addition to its CPA Exam Review, Becker currently offers exam preparation for a number of other international accounting credentials: Certified Management Accountant (CMA), Chartered Institute of Management Accountants (CIMA) and Diploma in International Financial Reporting (DipIFR) certifications. Becker also provides continuing professional education (CPE) and project management training.

In 2012, Becker acquired Falcon Physician Reviews and expanded into the healthcare education field.  Through Falcon, Becker now offers review programs for physicians who are preparing for the United States Medical Licensing Examination (USMLE) and the Comprehensive Osteopathic Medical Licensing Examination (COMLEX).

Becker has since discontinued the USMLE & NCLEX programs as Kaplan acquired it.

In 2022, Adtalem Global Education sold Becker to Colibri.

References

External links
 Becker Professional Education

Education companies of the United States
Test preparation companies
American companies established in 1960
1960 establishments in Ohio
Professional ethics
Adtalem Global Education